The CZ 2075 RAMI is a semi-automatic pistol made by Česká zbrojovka Uherský Brod (CZUB) in the Czech Republic. It features a staggered-column magazine, all-metal construction or optional Polyframe, and a hammer-forged floating barrel. The gun's name, RAMI, is derived from combining the first two letters of the designers' given names, Radek Hauerland and Milan Trkulja.

Design

The RAMI is similar to the CZ 75, however the design has been reduced in size to create an ideal concealed carry firearm for those who find the CZ 75 or similar handguns too bulky.

The RAMI is available in both 9 mm and .40 S&W calibers. Depending on caliber, the ammunition capacity of the magazine will vary from 10+1 or 14+1  (10 in the magazine and one round in the chamber) with the 9 mm version.  7+1 or 9+1 available in the .40 S&W version.

The RAMI can be fired either double or single action. The 2075 RAMI also features full length slide grooves which minimize play in the action and increases overall accuracy. The 2075 is designed with a slide lock that holds the chamber open after the last round in the magazine has been fired.

The RAMI is quickly disassembled for cleaning and maintenance. To do this the slide stop is pushed out and the slide is pulled forward off the pistol frame. This allows the action to be further dismantled separating the barrel, recoil spring, and trigger components. Further tear down (e.g. firing pin cleaning) should only be performed by a competent gunsmith.

Variants 

The CZ 2075 RAMI was produced in two variants; an alloy  frame model (meaning the "body" of the pistol below the slide is constructed of metal) or polymer. The alloy model has the advantage of increased ruggedness, customizable grips, and increased weight which helps absorb recoil. The polyframe design offers corrosion resistant polymer and lighter weight (both attributes sought by individuals who carry concealed). Both variants are available in either 9mm or .40 S&W caliber. The 9mm version can utilize an extended magazine, increasing ammunition capacity to 14+1. The CZ 2075 RAMI will also accept all standard CZ 75 mags, including the 18 round SP-01 magazine, 19 round SP-01 magazine, and ProMag 32-round magazine.

The CZ2075 RAMI polymer version was discontinued as of 2011, and the alloy frame version was discontinued in the .40 S&W caliber in 2016 and in the 9mm in 2020.

Safety features 
Most firearms, including the CZ 2075 RAMI, offer safety features which help to minimize the chance of a negligent discharge.

The CZ 2075 features an inertia pin safety that prevents the firing pin from protruding through the pin hole and making contact with the back of a chambered cartridge in the event the pistol is dropped.

The CZ 2075 BD model replaces the manual safety with a decocker, allowing the user to safely lower the hammer and prevent accidental firing. The decocker mechanism integrates a catch between the uncocked and fully cocked position that is designed to keep the hammer from striking the firing pin during the event the thumb should slip off the hammer prematurely during cocking. Pulling the trigger disables this safety, allowing the pistol to discharge.

Sights 
The CZ 2075 RAMI comes with factory installed  combat sights (sometimes referred to as "three-dot sights"). Night sights are available for the RAMI that feature tritium inserts for better visibility in low light conditions.

References

External links

 Ceska Zbrojovka official website
 CZ-USA official website
 Review at Gearhunts.com

Semi-automatic pistols of Czechoslovakia
9mm Parabellum semi-automatic pistols
.40 S&W semi-automatic pistols